Najmadin Shukr Rauf Zanganeh or "Mama Risha" (July 1, 1957 – January 25, 1985), was a prominent member of the Peshmerga loyal to the PUK.

He is known for his courage and fearlessness, he became a heroic and courageous Peshmerga and fought for the freedom of Kurdistan, and for that he sacrificed his life and war for this freedom and soul. Made it a name that would be famous.

Early life 
He was born in the village of Talaban near Kirkuk into a poor family from the Zangana tribe. Since there were no schools in their village, he never received an education. He was soon recognized for his potential as a guerrilla fighter as well as his personal qualities like bravery, courage, sincerity and fairness. He became the commander of the Karti 4 brigade in 1982. Under his command, Karti 4 became one of the most effective forces of PUK. His mental strength as well as his physical strength, stamina, and speed gave him a near mythical status in Kurdish society who were suffering oppression under Saddam Hussein's rule. According to some sources, he chose the nickname "Mama Risha" because he swore that he would never shave his beard until Kurdistan was fully free from the Ba'ath Party's control. He was also nicknamed the "Iron Man" for his furious and well organized battles and ambushes against the Iraqi forces near the Kirkuk area The biggest war he has participated in is called the Hamek War War, which was in the Hamek area, with 11 other soldiers facing more than 1,000 Iraqis soldiers and helicopters and scored victories.

See also
Peshmerga
Patriotic Union of Kurdistan
Iran–Iraq War

References

External links

Iraqi Kurdish people
1957 births
People from Kirkuk Governorate
1985 deaths
Kurdish guerrillas
Kurdish military personnel killed in action
Kurdish nationalists